Alonso Coello Camarero (born October 12, 1999) is a Spanish professional footballer who plays for Toronto FC II in MLS Next Pro.

Early life
Born in Madrid, Spain, Coello began playing football at age four with Madrid Sur de Vallecas, eventually moving onto the Atlético Madrid youth system, when he was six, where he played for five years. Afterwards, he joined the youth system of Rayo Vallecano. With the Rayo Vallecano Juvenil, he won the Copa Federación Nacional Juvenil.

College career
In 2018, he moved to the United States to attend Florida Atlantic University, where he played for the men's soccer team, joining through the La Liga ProPlayer initiative, a program that allows players from academy teams in Spain, between the ages 16 and 22, to go to the United States to play college soccer, where they can earn a university degree concurrently. At FAU, he studied economics. He scored his first goal on October 19, 2018, on a free kick, against the FIU Panthers. During his freshman season, he led the team with four assists and was named to the C-USA All-Conference Third Team and the C-USA All-Freshman Team. As a sophomore, he became FAU’s first-ever player to earn C-USA First Team honors. In his junior year, he was named to the All-C-USA Second Team. In his senior year in 2021, he was named to the All-C-USA Second Team, All-C-USA Tournament Team, and United Soccer Coaches All-Southeast Region Third Team, as FAU reached the C-USA finals for the first time in program history. He served as a team captain from 2019 to 2021.

Club career
In 2019, he played with the Dalton Red Wolves in USL League Two. In 2020, he was set to join the Portland Timbers U23 in USL2, however, the season was cancelled due to the COVID-19 pandemic.

In 2022, he signed a professional contract with Toronto FC II in MLS Next Pro. He scored his first professional goal on May 8, converting a penalty kick against New York City FC II.

References

External links

1999 births
Living people
Spanish footballers
Spanish expatriate footballers
Footballers from Madrid
Association football midfielders
Florida Atlantic Owls men's soccer players
USL League Two players
Atlético Madrid footballers
Rayo Vallecano players
Toronto FC II players
MLS Next Pro players